Nicholas J. Eberhard (May 30, 1874 – January 31, 1957) was an American politician from New York.

Life 
Eberhard was born on May 30, 1874 in New York City, New York. He was the only son of German immigrants Nicholas Eberhard (April 7, 1836 – December 4, 1915) and Anna Eberhard nee Brown or Braun (November 8, 1837 – April 28, 1918).  His siblings were Anna (Fleming); Josephine (Grove); and Catharine (Groneberg).

After finishing public school in 1888, Eberhard began working as a printer. In 1894, he joined the New York County Clerk office, first and then as assistant equity clerk. In 1914, he was sent to organize and systematize the newly-created Bronx County clerk's office as its executive clerk. He continued working there until 1921. In 1913, he established the co-partnership of N. J. Eberhard & Company, which was in the real estate and general insurance business.

In 1921, Eberhard was elected to the New York State Assembly as a Democrat, representing the Bronx County 1st District. He served in the Assembly in 1922, 1923, 1924, 1925, 1926, 1927, 1928, 1929, 1930, 1931, 1932, and 1933. He then served as Bronx County Clerk from 1933 until his retirement in 1937. He was politically active in the Bronx Democratic Party from 1913 until 1956, serving as leader of the 1st Assembly District from 1931 to 1944.

Eberhard attended the St. Angela Merici's Church. He was a member of the Knights of Columbus and the Elks. He married Agnes Clark. Their children were Virginia, Nicholas Jr., and Catherine Anna.

Eberhard died at home on January 31, 1957. He was buried in Calvary Cemetery.

References

External links 

 The Political Graveyard

1874 births
1957 deaths
Politicians from the Bronx
20th-century American politicians
Democratic Party members of the New York State Assembly
Catholics from New York (state)
Burials at Calvary Cemetery (Queens)